 is a Japanese photographer who specializes in documenting Tibet and China.

Shibata was born in Nagasaki in 1966. After graduating from Keio University (Tokyo) in 1990 he joined Kyodo News, but he left and turned freelance in 1995.

Shibata's photographs of Tibet have appeared in his book Tibetans; those of China and Northern Ireland have appeared in photographic magazines.

Exhibitions
"Lhasa", Wakita Gallery (Nagoya), 1993.
"Shangri-La at the End of a Century". Kodak Photo Salon (Ginza, Tokyo), 1997.
"The Land of Kesar". Minolta Photo Space (Shinjuku, Tokyo), 1998.
"Tibetans". Nikon Salon (Shinjuku, Tokyo), 2005.
"Alley Theater in Canton". Olympus Gallery (Kanda, Tokyo), 2005.
"Children from a Village of Acrobats". Konica Minolta Plaza (Shinjuku, Tokyo), 2007.
"Back-Street Mandala". Nikon Salon (Shinjuku, Tokyo), 2007.
"Pre-Olympic Beijing". Konica Minolta Plaza (Shinjuku, Tokyo), 2008.

Book
Tibetans. Hakodate: Mole, 2002. .

Notes

External links
Shibata's website 
Shibata's website 
Shibata's blog 
Shibata's work on printing-out paper, alternativephotography.com 

Japanese photographers
Photography in China
People from Nagasaki
1966 births
Living people